Magui or Magüi may refer to:

 Magüí Payán, town and municipality in the Nariño Department, Colombia
 Magüi Serna (born 1979), Spanish tennis player
 Magdalena Aicega (born 1973), nicknamed Magui, Argentine field hockey player
 Madre de aguas, also known as Magüi, mythical creature in the folklore of Cuba